Murli Manohar Joshi (born 5 January 1934) is an  Indian politician. He is a member of the Bharatiya Janata Party (BJP) of which he was the President between 1991 and 1993, and the former Member of Parliament for Kanpur parliamentary constituency. He was formerly a professor of physics in University of Allahabad. He was one of the key leaders of the BJP. Joshi later became the Union Human Resources Development minister in the National Democratic Alliance government. Joshi was awarded Padma Vibhushan, the second-highest civilian award, in 2017 by the Government of India.

Background and personal life 
Joshi was born in Delhi on 05 January 1934. His family hails from Almora in Kumaon region, which is now part of the Uttarakhand state. His father's name was Shri Manmohan Joshi. The family belongs to the Brahmin community. In 1956, Joshi was married to Smt. Tarla Joshi, a lady of his own community and similar family background, in a match arranged by their families in the usual Indian way. The lifelong marriage has proven entirely harmonious and conventional. The couple are the parents of two daughters, Nivedita and Priyamvada.

Education
Joshi had his early education in Chandpur, district Bijnor and in Almora, from where his family hails. He completed his B.Sc. from Meerut College and M.Sc. from Allahabad University. In Allahabad, one of his teachers was Professor Rajendra Singh, who later became the RSS Sanghchalak. 

Joshi did his doctorate in Physics at Allahabad University. The subject of his doctoral thesis was spectroscopy. He published a research paper in Physics in Hindi, which was a first of its kind. After completing his PhD, Joshi started teaching physics at Allahabad University.

Politics and activism 
Joshi came in contact with the RSS in Delhi at a young age and took part in the Cow Protection Movement in 1953–54, in the Kumbh Kisan Andolan of UP in 1955, demanding halving of land revenue assessment. During the Emergency period (1975–1977) in India, Joshi was in jail from 26 June 1975 until the Lok Sabha elections in 1977. He was elected Member of Parliament from Almora. When the Janata Party (which then included his party) came to power forming the first non-Congress government in Indian history, Joshi was elected General Secretary of the Janata Parliamentary Party. After the fall of the government, his party came out of Janata Party in 1980, and formed the Bharatiya Janata Party or the BJP. Joshi first looked after the Central Office as a General Secretary and later became Party Treasurer. As General Secretary of BJP, he was directly in charge of Bihar, Bengal and North-Eastern States. Later, when BJP formed a government in India under Atal Bihari Vajpayee, Joshi served as the Human Resource Development Minister in the cabinet.

In December 1991, Joshi held a yatra, the Ekta Yatra, intended to signal that BJP supported national unity and opposed separatist movements. It began on 11 December in Kanyakumari, Tamil Nadu and visited 14 states. The rally's final stop to hoist the Indian flag in Jammu and Kashmir on 26 January 1992 was considered unsuccessful, with minimal local participation.

Joshi is known to have been influenced by the life and work of Babasaheb Ambedkar, Mahatma Jyotiba Phule and Deendayal Upadhyaya. Joshi was a three-term M.P. from Allahabad before he was defeated in the Lok Sabha elections of May 2004. He won election to the 15th Lok Sabha from Varanasi as a BJP candidate.
He also served as the home minister for 13 days government in 1996.
Joshi was appointed as Chairman of the Manifesto Preparation Board of the BJP in 2009. He was honoured as "Proud Past Alumni" of Allahabad University by Allahabad University Alumni Association. He was a sitting MP from Varanasi and he vacated that seat for Narendra Modi in 2014 Lok Sabha Elections. He later contested from Kanpur and won from the constituency by a margin of 2.23 lac votes.

Awards and honours 
Padma Vibhushan (2017)

References

External links

 Reflections... Murli Manohar Joshi's blog
 BJP profile of M.M. Joshi

 

Rashtriya Swayamsevak Sangh pracharaks
Bharatiya Janata Party politicians from Uttar Pradesh
Living people
University of Allahabad alumni
Rajya Sabha members from Uttar Pradesh
1934 births
India MPs 1977–1979
Presidents of Bharatiya Janata Party
India MPs 1996–1997
India MPs 1998–1999
India MPs 1999–2004
India MPs 2009–2014
Lok Sabha members from Uttar Pradesh
India MPs 2014–2019
People from Nainital
Education Ministers of India
Recipients of the Padma Vibhushan in public affairs
Politicians from Varanasi
Politicians from Kanpur
Politicians from Allahabad
People from Almora district
Rajya Sabha members from the Bharatiya Janata Party